Kundapitha is a village situated in Ghatgaon tehsil, Keonjhar district, Odisha, India. Its nearest railway station is in Harichandanpur, accessible via National Highway 215. The village area is about 9 km2 or 2,192 acres.

Kundapitha (Deogarh, Odisha) is a village situated in Basalai Gram Panchayat of Barkote Panchayat Samiti of Deogarh district.

Villages in Kendujhar district